Vincent Bikana (born 26 February 1992) is a Cameroonian professional footballer who plays as a defender for Malaysia Super League club Terengganu FC.

Clubs

Neuchâtel Xamax purchased the Cameroonian under-20 international defender from Corinthians for a reported fee of €1.2 million. The Swiss club was eventually relegated from the Super League due to financial problems and Bikana joined a Romanian club Petrolul Ploieşti.

In November 2012, Bikana moved to Malaysian side Terengganu. His stint with Terengganu ends at the end the 2016 season.

References

1992 births
Living people
Cameroonian footballers
Footballers from Douala
Association football defenders
Sport Club Corinthians Paulista players
Neuchâtel Xamax FCS players
FC Petrolul Ploiești players
Swiss Super League players
Liga I players
Cameroonian expatriate footballers
Cameroonian expatriate sportspeople in Romania
Expatriate footballers in Romania
Expatriate footballers in Brazil
Expatriate footballers in Switzerland
Terengganu FC players
Expatriate footballers in Malaysia
Cameroon under-20 international footballers